Domenico Giuseppe Serafino (born 1967) is an Italian musician and music producer. He is best noted for his role as chairman/ owner of association football clubs in Italy and Wales, many of which have gone out of business.

Music career
Serafino is a musician and music producer - and has had some popularity within South America during his musical career, particularly in the mid-1990s through to the 2000s. "His style defies conventional definitions, lying somewhere at the intersection of rap, funk and rock, with African influences in both sound and aesthetic." The video for his 1999 song Ma Chi M’accompagna features former Italian international footballer, Roberto Baggio.

1992 - First record-making experience: the magazine Tournèe produced the
promotional CD "Albaria" and enclosed it to the magazine. Until 1994, Serafino
made a series of concerts positively reviewed by the journalists of the sector.

1995 - In November the CD "Serafino" was published. The album contained a
single, "Mina Vagante". It was broadcast by several radios. On June 7,
Serafino played, with his band, in the Paolo Rossi show Il Circo. On Dec. 22, at
the Teatro Smeraldo in Milan, he opened Jesus Christ Superstar, the musical.

1996 - He presented “Suono Vitale”, a music TV program for a private TV
broadcasting circuit together with Ilaria Paganini. On Dec. 24, he made a
sound performance, in Piazza Duca D'Aosta, in Milan. TG3 broadcast an
interview with Serafino. In those years, Serafino strived together with Mimmo
Ferrante against architectural and cultural barriers which trouble the disabled.
Many impressive initiatives were shot by the nation-wide media. Ferrante, the
dearest friend of the musician, died in December 1996 due to a very serious
form of muscle dystrophy.

1997 - On Dec. 4, the CD "Provare per credere" is presented. Serafino both
wrote music and interpreted the piece with the vocal support of top artists like
Franca Rame, Paolo Rossi, Claudio Bisio and Pino Scotto. This project was
meant to be tribute a Mimmo Ferrante. Always in December, the singer
participated to Telethon (RAIDUE) with the song "Mi dichiaro in arresto" and to
“Help” a Red Ronnie programme. It is also worth mentioning the review on
“Tutto Musica” with the interview to Paolo Rossi and Serafino.

1998 - On Jan. 28, a Serafino concert at Palavobis in Milano opened a week of
celebration in honour of Ghandi. In October the Cinquestelle circuit began to
cross the South of Italy, a program called Sudando Musica, a container of trips
to discover talents in the southern regions who, through television, tell the ups
and downs of an artist’s life. Serafino lead and improvised a jam session with
his colleagues … La theme song of the programme is the song "Mi converto".
On Dec. 16, Fuego (ITALIA 1) presented as an avant-première the Videoclip
"Chi mi accompagna?". An exclusive interview to the football player Roberto
Baggio was broadcast and Serafino managed to make the football player rap
on a pressing e involving music; the initiative, coordinated by Luca Bonato,
belonged to an awareness-raising campaign promoted ANFFAS to review a law
for those affected by serious mental troubles.

1999 - On Feb. 2, a single "Chi mi accompagna?" was officially distributed (RTI):
RAI, MEDIASET and many private TV networks gave a wide space to the event
with many reports; nameplates like TV Sorrisi & Canzoni, Corriere della Sera,
la Repubblica, il Mattino, La Stampa and La gazzetta dello Sport published
quite many reviews, also due to a press release by ANSA. During the 49th San
Remo Festival, on Feb. 26, Serafino held a performance at the Video and Radio
Italia Solo Musica Italiana space that began satellite broadcasting of the
Videoclip with Baggio. In the month of July, Serafino was the lead of a really
original event: in Fuscaldo, a small town in the Calabria hinterland, a real
people’s petition was made to the local town councillors to ask to organise a
concert of the singer-songwriter who would perform on Aug. 8, on an
overcrowded waterfront.

2000 - In them month of January, Serafino was invited as guest at many
emissions of the TV programme Casa Mosca, presented by Maurizio Mosca,
where he proposed his music with acoustic live performances. On Feb. 26, he
was again in Sanremo but as a guest, with his band in full force, at the
Sanremo Rock Festival event. The recording of new songs began as well as an
artistic co-operation with the actress Bedy Moratti who lent her voice in an
atmosphere piece titled "Cerco Spiegazioni" to be launched on the web. Late in
the year, Serafino was recognized as the best emerging artist of Mediterranean
music.

2001 - Unplugged concerts confirmed the versatility and the talent of an artist
who began to be appreciated by World-fame artists as Tullio De Piscopo.
Serafino began to work with the Neapolitan percussion player and singer. In
Aprica, they played on the same stage to liberated pure music energy and
adrenaline. The single "Il mio Compare" was broadcast overseas since May 7
by a Boston-based US Station (USA), Radio 740 AM; this same piece got to the
top of a special hit on the portal www.mp3.it for the high number of downloads
and, since the month of November, also Italian radios started to broadcast it.
In the same month, the Videoclip "Il mio Compare" was shot in the town of
Cetraro. The video-clip makers were the students of the School of Art of
Cetraro.

2002 - On May 3 the CD "Uè compà" was presented at the Classico Village in
Rome, an EP with four new songs, available on the web only. In the summer,
Serafino got the top of the Italian Hit of Vitaminic. The success of the Serafino
pieces continued on the Web, as a matter of fact there were tens of thousands
of downloads and the piece “Naviga nella rete”, launched as a promotion on
Vitaminic, remained at the top of the etnofunk hit for several weeks. A new
version of the song “Chi mi accompagna?” got the top of the hit on the Italian
hits on that same portal.

2003 - On June 30, with Swing label, distributed by Self, the single piece
“Naviga nella rete” was published. In August Serafino took part as a guest to
Girofestival broadcast by the RAI TV channels, at TimTour in the stage of
Palermo and to NordSudOvestEst on RAIDUE.

2004 - The Suoneria Mediterranea project was finally implemented with the new
music program edited by Serafino and broadcast on Telespazio 1, a
container inside “E’ sempre Domenica” presented by Paolo Giura and Luigi
Grandinetti. On may 10, “VERISSIMO” (Canale 5) broadcast an interview to
Serafino, made in Calabria, the region where he lives. “A Sud io migrerò”
became the theme song of a summer program “La mappa dei piaceri” daily
broadcast by Telespazio from June to September.

2005 - In February, the piece "100% Calabrese Sugnu" jumps 1st place of the
best sold song on Vitaminic, and in May 23 the single "Very Etnico" begins to
be radio-broadcast in Italy; on June 19, RadioRai1 proposed an interview
and three albums in avant-premiere. From June 20, "A Sud io migrerò" was
again the theme music of "La mappa dei piaceri". The song "Il Cinematografo"
became the sound track of the Magna Graecia Film Festival. On Aug. 22, in
Decollatura, " guest of " Ad esempio a me piace il Sud! To recall the late Rino
Gaetano.

2006 - On Jan. 13, on Telespazio 1, the new TV series "Suoneria Mediterranea",
stared again. It is the music program devised by Serafino, and devoted to
artists and productions made in the South. On Jan. 23, the Album Very Etnico
was in music shops and, on Feb. 5 a tours began in Naples to promote the new
CD. "Arabica Café" was the single piece broadcast by the Italian radios. On
May 4, Serafino played in the Auditorium of Popolare Network in Milan in
National Live. On Aug. 1 RAINEWS 24 presented the new videoclip with an
interview to the rasta, broadcast again by RAITRE. On Nov. 12, Serafino
played in Argentina in the Hugo del Carril amphitheatre in Buenos Aires, and
on the 19 he performed again at the Coliseum Theatre of the same town.

Football chairman and owner

Bangor City
In the summer of 2019, with then Cymru Premier club Bangor City in financial troubles via the then ownership of Vaughan Sports Management, new investment and ownership was being sought. By September a consortium of investors had taken control of Bangor and Serafino was installed as chairman. 
Serafino brought in Argentine World Cup winner Pedro Pasculli as the new manager of the team.

In April 2020 Serafino made a £5,000 donation to local hospital Ysbyty Gwynedd to help it fight the outbreak of coronavirus. The club finished the inaugural Cymru North season in fifth place in a season curtailed by the COVID-19 pandemic with the final table determined on a points-per-game basis.

In April 2021 the club was refused a Tier 1 licence on the basis of a failure to provide the club's financial accounts as part of their application along with an issue in relation to coaching qualifications.

Concerns over unpaid wages for club players and club officials were reported in the press In October 2021, who noted similarities to a situation in early 2021 at Sambenedettese. The club were summoned by the Football Association of Wales to a disciplinary hearing over the matter.  The panel ruled that "all outstanding monies" must be paid within 31 days from 29 October 2021 - the club owed nearly £53,000 of unpaid wages to players and staff - with the sanction in the event of non-payment being the club would be banned "from all football related activity". On 30 November the Football Association of Wales suspended the club from all football related activity after they failed to comply with the payment of outstanding monies. As the club were suspended from football their Cymru North matches against five clubs were postponed between 30 November and February 2022, with the club docked three points for each missed match and also fined.

On 7 January 2022 it was announced by FAW that the club had not applied for a licence to compete in the tier 2 Cymru North for the 2022–23 season, or at tier 3 level. On 14 January the club's academy announced on social media that closing with immediate effect after no support was forthcoming from the club and there had been no concrete evidence from the FAW or the club that the situation at the club was going to improve.

On 11 February the FAW announced that the club had until 19 February to pay all outstanding fines or they would be immediately expelled from the Cymru North. It also announced that in the event the club paid outstanding fines, they would have to play all subsequent league fixtures or they would also face immediate expulsion from the league.

"A club competing in the second tier of Welsh professional football" and "a club with a noteworthy history. They have had some spells in the international European tournaments" was shortly afterwards advertised for sale with asking price of £1.25 million. The club was reported as Bangor City with the Daily Post noting the "eye-watering price" did not include the club's ground which was leased from the council.

On 18 February the club announced in an official statement by Serafino they had informed the FAW that they had withdrawn from the Cymru North for the 2021–22 season. They also noted plans to return to play for the following season. Later that day, the FAW confirmed that the club's withdrawal had been accepted and it's playing record in the league for the season had been expunged.

Sambenedettese
In June 2020 he was unveiled as the new owner and chairman of Italian Serie C side S.S. Sambenedettese Calcio. He claimed to have paid former owner Franco Fedeli over 1.2 million euros for the club. The deal was announced by the club on 10 June.

In late March 2021 the club's players threatened to strike, and not play the match scheduled for Saturday 3 April in Matelica. A statement by the Italian Footballers Association, which published the press release, stated that the players had not received payment of the monthly salaries of November – December 2020 and January – February 2021 and that Sefarino had personally assured them that he would settle the arrears of salaries no later than Friday 2 April.

In April 2021 the club were docked four points from their current campaign due to unpaid player wages, fined €3,000 and Serafino was given a six-month suspension from running football clubs in a decision by the FIGC tribunal.   A pig's head was left outside Serafino's home in Italy with under it a photo of Serafino - it was believed this related to the lack of payment of players' wages. In early April, five different companies sought bankruptcy petitions for non-payment of delivery of services.

After Serafino's failure to comply with several financial requirements, the club was declared bankrupt by the Court of Ascoli Piceno in May 2021. Entrepreneur Roberto Renzi took over the club, it was refounded as A.S. Sambenedettese and, after repaying all debts, was formally accepted by the Italian Football Federation, rejoining in the Serie D league.

Journalism investigation
Serafino's ownership of both clubs was part of a British Broadcasting Corporation Wales investigation, broadcast on UK television in May 2022. A few days later Serafino publicly denounced this television report, accusing his former partner and a group close to him, of having organized a defamatory press campaign, to weaken the figure of the President, causing serious economic and image damage to the Company and to his person. According to Serafino, the precise intention of his former partner Kim Dae Jung (Baram) was to cause the bankruptcy of Sambenedettese for personal gain, trying to buy it back at auction at a later time.
Serafino declared that he was the victim of a real conspiracy to take the two Clubs away from him , after having created a Academy, a sports center (Samba Village) and after having started a re-foundation of the Sambenedettese, a job until that moment appreciated by the fans.

Personal life
Serafino is from Calabria in the south of Italy and a fan of Cosenza Calcio.
From 2009 he lives in Buenos Aires (Argentina)

References

External links
Official music website
YouTube homepage
Facebook homepage
 Twitter homepage

1967 births
Living people
Italian expatriates in Argentina
Italian musicians
Italian football chairmen and investors
Italian music people
Bangor City F.C.
A.S. Sambenedettese
Association football chairmen and investors
Italian businesspeople